In algebra, the polynomial remainder theorem or little Bézout's theorem (named after Étienne Bézout) is an application of Euclidean division of polynomials. It states that the remainder of the division of a polynomial  by a linear polynomial  is equal to  In particular,  is a divisor of  if and only if  a property known as the factor theorem.

Examples

Example 1 
Let . Therefore, .

Example 2
Show that the polynomial remainder theorem holds for an arbitrary second degree polynomial  by using algebraic manipulation:

Multiplying both sides by  gives

Since  is the remainder, we have indeed shown that .

Proof 

Setting  in this formula, we obtain:

A slightly different proof, which may appear to some people as more elementary, starts with an observation that  is a linear combination of terms of the form   each of which is divisible by  since

Applications 

The polynomial remainder theorem may be used to evaluate  by calculating the remainder, . Although polynomial long division is more difficult than evaluating the function itself, synthetic division is computationally easier.  Thus, the function may be more "cheaply" evaluated using synthetic division and the polynomial remainder theorem.

The factor theorem is another application of the remainder theorem: if the remainder is zero, then the linear divisor is a factor. Repeated application of the factor theorem may be used to factorize the polynomial.

References 

Theorems about polynomials